Nogometni klub Bela Krajina, commonly referred to as NK Bela Krajina, was a Slovenian football club which played in the town of Črnomelj, White Carniola.

History
The club was founded on 17 November 1930 as Športni klub Bela krajina or simply SKB. They played in the Slovenian Republic League until the Second World War. After the war, they played in a minor Regional Leagues of the Yugoslav football system.

In the 2003–04 season, Bela Krajina finished in the second place in the Slovenian Second League. They lost in the promotion play-offs against Drava Ptuj, but were promoted as a result of a withdrawal of the three other teams. In the 2005–06 season, Bela Krajina finished in the ninth place and had to play in the relegation play-offs. They defeated Dravinja on away goals rule, securing their position in the First League for another season.

In the 2006–07 season, Bela Krajina was relegated back to the Second League after finishing in the last, tenth position. They stayed in Second League until 2013–14 season when they finished last. Unable getting a licence for the Slovenian Third League they were thus relegated directly from Second League to the Intercommunal level.

NK Bela Krajina was dissolved following the 2015–16 season.

Slovenian First League placements

Honours

Slovenian Third League
Winners: 2000–01
MNZ Ljubljana Cup
Winners: 2007–08, 2008–09

References

Association football clubs established in 1930
Football clubs in Yugoslavia
1930 establishments in Slovenia
2016 disestablishments in Slovenia
Defunct football clubs in Slovenia
Association football clubs disestablished in 2016